

List of colonial heads of Bissau
The territory is located in Guinea-Bissau.

Early incumbents, all styled Captain-major:
15 March 1692 – 15 March 1694 José Pinheiro da Câmara
1694–1696 Santao Vidigal Castanho
1696–1699 José Pinheiro da Câmara
1699–1707 Rodrigo Oliveira da Fonseca
1707–1753 abandoned
1753–17.. Nicolau Pino de Araújo
17..–c.1757 ....
c.1757–1759 Manuel Pires
1759–17.. Duarte José Róis
17..–c.1763 ....
c.1763–17.. Filipe José de Souto-Maior
c.1770–c.1775 Sebastião da Cunha Souto-Maior
c.1775–c.1777 ....
c.1777–17.. Ignácio Xavier Baião
1793–c.1796 José António Pinto
c.1796–1799 ....

See also
Guinea-Bissau
Heads of State of Guinea-Bissau
Heads of Government of Guinea-Bissau
Colonial Heads of Portuguese Guinea
Colonial Heads of Cacheu
Lists of office-holders
List of national leaders

Sources and references
WorldStatesmen–Guinea-Bissau

History of Guinea-Bissau
Bissau
Bissau
Portuguese Guinea
Bissau
Guinea-Bissau-related lists